Whatever is the third studio album by guitarist Jennifer Batten, released on September 10, 2007 through Wood Bell Records (Japan) and on April 18, 2008 through Lion Music (Europe). Included with the album is a DVD containing a selection of instructional footage and music videos by Batten, as well as music videos by guest videographers/editors.

Track listing

Personnel
Jennifer Batten – guitar, guitar synthesizer, programming, spoken vocals (tracks 2, 4), sound effects (track 10), production
Ann Marie Crouch – vocals (track 4), spoken vocals (track 4)
Leah Santos – vocals (track 6)
Herman Begay – vocals (track 8)
Michael Jordan – drums (track 10), percussion (track 5), sound effects (track 10)
Sandin Wilson – bass (track 2)
Andre Berry – bass (track 3)
Skip Vonkuske – cello
Nelly Kovalev – violin
Betsy Hamilton – Native American flute
Jon Clark – spoken vocals (track 1)
Debbie Schepps – spoken vocals (track 3)
Sean Dailey – spoken vocals (track 4)
Bret Helm – spoken vocals (tracks 4, 9)
Kari Helm – spoken vocals (track 4)
Nel Gerome – spoken vocals (track 4)
Nick Moon – mixing
Chris Bellman – mastering

References

External links
 at Guitar Nine Records (archived)

Jennifer Batten albums
2007 albums
Lion Music albums